Patricia Barber (born November 8, 1955) is an American songwriter, composer, singer, and pianist.

Biography
Barber's father Floyd was a jazz saxophonist who played with Bud Freeman and Glenn Miller. She played saxophone and piano from a young age, sang in musicals in high school, and studied piano at the University of Iowa in the early 1970s. From there Barber went to Chicago and began performing regularly in bars and clubs. She won a Guggenheim Fellowship in music composition in March 2003, an unusual accomplishment for someone working in the field of popular songwriting. The Guggenheim allowed her to devote time to a song cycle based on Ovid’s Metamorphoses. She is married to musicologist Martha Feldman.

Awards and honors
 She was given a Guggenheim Fellowship in 2003 in the field of Creative Arts – Music Composition.
 She was elected to the American Academy of Arts and Sciences in 2019.

Discography
An asterisk (*) indicates that the year is that of release.

Source:

References

External links
 Official website
 Patricia Barber collection at the Internet Archive's live music archive
 Review of Mythologies by JazzChicago.net

1955 births
Living people
Post-bop singers
Post-bop pianists
Cabaret singers
American blues singer-songwriters
American jazz singers
American jazz songwriters
American jazz pianists
Lesbian singers
LGBT people from Illinois
LGBT people from Nebraska
American lesbian musicians
American LGBT singers
American LGBT songwriters
Lesbian songwriters
American women jazz singers
People from South Sioux City, Nebraska
Blue Note Records artists
20th-century American pianists
20th-century American women pianists
Jazz musicians from Nebraska
21st-century American pianists
21st-century American women pianists
20th-century American LGBT people
21st-century American LGBT people
Singer-songwriters from Nebraska
Antilles Records artists
Concord Records artists
Women jazz pianists
American lesbian writers